

List of countries

Northern Europe